Polytrias is a  genus of Asian, African, and Pacific Island plants in the grass family, commonly called Java grass, Batiki bluegrass, Indian murainagrass, or toto grass. The only known species is Polytrias indica, native to West Africa (from Senegal to Cameroon), Seychelles, the Indian Subcontinent, southern China, Southeast Asia, New Guinea, Fiji, and Micronesia. It is also cultivated as a lawn grass in other tropical regions, and naturalized in scattered locations in tropical North and South America.

References

External links

Andropogoneae
Monotypic Poaceae genera
Taxa named by Eduard Hackel